CFR Arad was a football club based in Arad, Romania, founded in 1921.

History

The club was born in 1921, and just after one year they merged with CS Gloria Arad, a team founded in 1913. Under the name Gloria CFR Arad they have the best performances inclusive a second place in Divizia A 1929–30.

But in 1934, after just 12 years the club fell apart in CS Gloria Arad and CFR Arad. The separation was not propitious for CFR Arad who start playing again in lower divisions, while CS Gloria Arad lived her glory years in Romanian First League.

They changed several names in the next years, till 1973 when they decide to merge again, this time with Vagonul Arad, under the name of Unirea Arad between 1973–1974 and Rapid Arad between 1974 and 1978.
In 1978 they again separate of the main team and play as CFR Arad in Liga III.

The team was dissolved in 1985.

Chronology of names

1 Football competitions suspended due to World War II. 
Italics – Names of the team under the mergers. 
Bold – Names of the team along the history.

Honours
Liga I
Runners-up (1): 1929–30
Quarter-finals in Cupa României (1): 1940–41

References

External links
 romaniansoccer.ro

CFR Arad
Defunct football clubs in Romania
Association football clubs established in 1921
Association football clubs disestablished in 1985
Liga I clubs
Liga II clubs
CFR Arad
CFR Arad